Ladies Love Outlaws is a 1974 country rock album from folk rock musician Tom Rush. The album spent nine weeks on the Billboard 200 charts, peaking at number 124 on November 16, 1974.

Track listing
"Ladies Love Outlaws" (Lee Clayton) – 2:28
"Hobo's Mandolin"  (Michael Peter Smith) – 3:12
"Indian Woman from Wichita" (Wayne Berry) – 4:19
"Maggie" (Tom Rush) – 3:32
"Desperados Waiting for a Train" (Guy Clark) – 3:30
"Claim on Me"  (Clayton) – 4:08
"Jenny Lynn" (Richard Dean) – 2:59
"Black Magic Gun" (Wayne Berry) – 3:26
"No Regrets" (Rush) – 5:41
"One Day I Walk" (Bruce Cockburn) – 2:15

Personnel

Musicians
 Tom Rush – acoustic guitar, lead vocals
 Jeff "Skunk" Baxter – electric guitar (tracks 1, 3), dobro (tracks 4, 8, 10), acoustic guitar (track 9), pedal steel guitar (tracks 6–9)
 Elliott Randall – electric guitar (tracks 1, 5–7, 9), acoustic guitar (tracks 1, 3–6, 8)
 Bob Babbitt – bass
 Jerry Friedman – electric guitar (tracks 6–7)
 Leon Pendarvis – keyboards (tracks 3, 6–7)
 Allan Schwartzberg – drums (tracks 1–3, 6–7)
 Andrew Smith – drums (tracks 5, 9)
 George Devens – percussion (tracks 6, 8–9)
 Rupert Holmes – background vocals (track 1), string arrangements (tracks 3–6, 9)
 James Taylor – background vocals (track 7)
 Carly Simon – background vocals (track 9)
 Carl Hall – background vocals (track 3)
 Tasha Thomas – background vocals (track 3)

The Memphis Horns
 Wayne Jackson – trumpet
 Jack Hale – trombone
 Ed Logan – tenor saxophone
 Andrew Love – tenor saxophone
 James Mitchell – baritone saxophone
(tracks 1, 5)

Technical
 Mark Spector – producer
 Alan Varner – engineer
 Lou Schlossberg – assistant engineer
 Terry Rosiello – assistant engineer
 Allan Blazek, Jeffrey Lesser, Roger Nichols, Stan Tonkel, Ted Sturges – additional engineering (overdubs)
 Stewart Romain – mastering
 John Berg – design
 Beverly Mundy – photography
 James Grashow – cover art

References

Tom Rush albums
1974 albums
Columbia Records albums